Wólka Czerwińska  is a village in the administrative district of Gmina Czerwin, within Ostrołęka County, Masovian Voivodeship, in east-central Poland.

The village has an approximate population of 50.

References

Villages in Ostrołęka County